is the 17th single by Japanese singer Yōko Oginome. Written by Narada Michael Walden, Joyce Imbesi, and Carolyn Hedrich, with Japanese lyrics by Shintarō Hirai, the single was released on January 18, 1989, by Victor Entertainment. It was Oginome's first and only single to be recorded and produced in the U.S.

Background and release
The song is the Japanese translation of the title track from Oginome's 1988 all-English album Verge of Love. Both "Verge of Love" and the B-side "Swoopin' In" were used as theme songs of the Fuji TV drama special , which also starred Oginome.

"Verge of Love" peaked at No. 5 on Oricon's singles chart. It also sold over 81,000 copies.

Track listing
All music is arranged by Narada Michael Walden.

Charts

References

External links

1989 singles
Yōko Oginome songs
Japanese-language songs
Japanese television drama theme songs
Songs written by Narada Michael Walden
Victor Entertainment singles